Paul Leeman (born 21 January 1978) is a Northern Irish football coach and former footballer who is currently first team coach at Crusaders.

He notably played for Glentoran for 15 years and captained the side to Irish League and cup titles, playing 597 times for the team, before being released in 2011. He moved to Crusaders in 2011, where he spent 4 years, winning another league title, Setanta Cup and Irish League Cup. He began coaching at Glentoran in 2018, becoming assistant manager in January 2019, before returning to his coaching role when Mick McDermott arrived at the club. Leeman left Glentoran in the summer of 2019.

Playing career

Glentoran
After playing for Dungoyne Boys, Leeman joined Glentoran as a schoolboy in 1993. Two years later he made his first-team debut. Initially playing in midfield and at right back, he switched to centre-back. He was named as the Ulster Footballer of the Year for the 2004/05 season. Leeman missed almost all of the 2005–06 season.

He brought his children out with him to lift the Irish Premier League trophy after Glentoran had beaten Cliftonville to see off the challenge of Linfield who had beaten Crusaders 5–0 at Seaview. He had his testimonial against Roy Keane's Ipswich Town, a 3–1 defeat. He was the fourth generation of his family to play for Glentoran.

Crusaders
Leeman joined fellow Belfast side Crusaders in June 2011, linking up with former Glens team-mate Michael Halliday. He scored his first Crusaders goal in a 5-1 league victory over Carrick Rangers on 29 October 2011.

Coaching career
Leeman returned to Glentoran as a coach on 24 May 2018 alongside former team-mate Gary Smyth. He became assistant manager on 3 January 2019, in a role he held until 31 March 2019. Following the sale of Glentoran, Leeman left the team in controversial circumstances on 23 May 2019, two days after Smyth.

He returned to Crusaders in July 2019, filling the post of first team coach vacated by the long-serving Charlie Murphy.

Honours
Glentoran
Irish Premier League (4): 1998-99, 2002-03, 2004-05, 2008-09
Irish Cup (4): 1997–98, 1999–2000, 2000–01, 2003–04
Gold Cup (3): 1997–98, 1998–99, 1999–2000
Irish League Cup (5): 2000–01, 2002–03, 2004–05, 2006–07, 2009–10
County Antrim Shield (6): 1997–98, 1998–99, 1999–2000, 2001–02, 2002–03, 2007–08

Crusaders
NIFL Premiership (1): 2014–15
Irish League Cup (1): 2011–12
Setanta Cup (1): 2012

References

External links
Official Glentoran website
Glentoran captain could miss rest of season
Leeman ready for Glentoran return
Glentoran clinch Premiership title
Leeman starts despite virus
Leeman could miss Premier opener
Leeman on target for Glentoran

Association footballers from Belfast
1978 births
Living people
Crusaders F.C. players
Glentoran F.C. players
Association footballers from Northern Ireland
Ulster Footballers of the Year
NIFL Premiership players
Association football defenders